The Best American Poetry 1992, a volume in The Best American Poetry series, was edited by David Lehman and by guest editor Charles Simic.

In the Forward, Lehman writes, "No critic will ever have the effect on our poets than certain of their grade school teachers had — the ones often credited by the poets themselves for their lifelong devotion to the art."

Lehman's forward also mentioned various public comments about the nation's lack of interest in poetry and questions about its future.

Poets and poems included

Publications most frequently represented
In order of frequency, these are the publications most represented this year:

See also
 1992 in poetry

Notes

External links
 Web page for contents of the book, with links to each publication where the poems originally appeared

Best American Poetry series
1992 poetry books
American poetry anthologies